Přerubenice is a municipality and village in Rakovník District in the Central Bohemian Region of the Czech Republic. It has about 80 inhabitants.

Administrative parts
The hamlet of Dučice is an administrative part of Přerubenice.

References

Villages in Rakovník District